List of English football transfers 2001–02 include:

List of English football transfers summer 2001
List of English football transfers winter 2001–02
List of English football transfers summer 2002

Transfers
2001